o-Anisidine (2-anisidine) is an organic compound with the formula CH3OC6H4NH2. A colorless liquid, commercial samples can appear yellow owing to air oxidation.  It is one of three isomers of the methoxy-containing aniline derivative.

Production and use
It is prepared via methanolysis of 2-chloronitrobenzene:
NaOCH3  +  ClC6H4NO2  →   CH3OC6H4NO2  +  NaCl
The resulting o-nitroanisole is reduced to o-anisidine.

o-Anisidine is used in the manufacture of dyes. It is nitrated to give 4-nitroanisidine.  It is also a precursor to o-dianisidine.

One special use is as a heartwood indicator. An acid solution of o-anisidine is  diazotized by adding a sodium nitrite solution. This mixture is applied to the wood and by reaction with polyphenols in the heartwood a reddish brown azo dye is formed.

Safety and environmental aspects
o-Anisidine is a dangerous pollutant from the production of dyes.  It is listed as RCRA hazardous waste, with the code K181. The International Agency for Research on Cancer (IARC) has classified o-anisidine as a Group 2B, possible human carcinogen.

References

External links 

Anilines
Hazardous air pollutants
IARC Group 2B carcinogens